Neal Cohen may refer to:

 Neal J. Cohen, professor of psychology
 Neal L. Cohen, New York City health commissioner

See also
 Neil Cohen (born 1955), American soccer defender
 Neil M. Cohen (born 1951), member of the New Jersey General Assembly